Edward Jackson, CBE (3 December 1922 – 5 October 2009) was an Indian cricketer. He played one first-class match for Delhi in 1946/47.

Jackson died in London on 5 October 2009, at the age of 86.

See also
 List of Delhi cricketers

References

External links
 

1922 births
2009 deaths
Commanders of the Order of the British Empire
Cricketers from Kolkata
Delhi cricketers
Indian cricketers